Narayangarh (also called Kasba Narayangarh) is a major Town in the Narayangarh CD block in the Kharagpur subdivision of the  Paschim Medinipur district in the state of West Bengal, India.

Geography

Location

Area overview
Kharagpur subdivision, shown partly in the map alongside, mostly has alluvial soils, except in two CD blocks in the west – Kharagpur I and Keshiary, which mostly have lateritic soils. Around 74% of the total cultivated area is cropped more than once. With a density of population of 787 per km2nearly half of the district’s population resides in this subdivision. 14.33% of the population lives in urban areas and 86.67% lives in the rural areas.

Note: The map alongside presents some of the notable locations in the subdivision. All places marked in the map are linked in the larger full screen map.

Demographics
According to the 2011 Census of India Kasba Narayangarh had a total population of 3,627 of which 1,848 (51%) were males and 1,779 (49%) were females. Population in the age range 0– 6 years was 477. The total number of literate persons in Kasba Narayangarh was 2,137 (58.92% of the population over 6 years).

.* For language details see Narayangarh (community development block)#Language and religion

Civic administration

CD block HQ
The headquarters of Narayangarh CD block are located at Narayangarh.

Police station
Narayangarh police station has jurisdiction over Narayangarh  CD block.

Transport
Narayangarh railway station is a station on the Kharagpur-Puri line of South Eastern Railway.

The Dankuni-Chennai National Highway 16 passes through Narayangarh.

See also
Narayangarh Raj

References

Villages in Paschim Medinipur district